Purple Haze is a 1982 dramedy about Matt Caulfield, a college student who is expelled for smoking cannabis and is subsequently drafted to serve in the Vietnam War in the summer of 1968.

Plot summary 
The film opens at Princeton University, 1968, where Matt Caulfield and his friends are watching television. There, they witness President Lyndon B. Johnson inform us of his plans not to rerun in the upcoming election. Upon hearing of his plans, Matt and the rest of the students celebrate by smoking marijuana. An "uncool" student from next door is disturbed by the boys' racket, and upon being pelted with junkfood by the boys for telling them to be quiet, he calls the police. Within minutes, Matt and his roommates are caught smoking and are banned from college campus. Matt returns home to his family, where he is faced with various issues before being shipped off to Vietnam.

Reception 
Despite receiving positive reviews in some mainstream publishings, Purple Haze was a flop. It faded into obscurity shortly after its release.

Soundtrack 
Purple Haze featured many pieces of music, mainly period rock tracks from the mid- to late 1960s.
"When I Was Young" by the Animals
"For What It's Worth" by Buffalo Springfield
"Expecting to Fly" by Buffalo Springfield
"I Feel Free" by Cream
"So You Want to Be a Rock 'n' Roll Star" by the Byrds
"I-Feel-Like-I'm-Fixin'-to-Die Rag" by Country Joe and the Fish
"Eight Miles High" by the Byrds
"Magic Carpet Ride" by Steppenwolf
"White Rabbit" by Jefferson Airplane
"Embryonic Journey" by Jefferson Airplane
"A Whiter Shade of Pale" by Procol Harum
"A Salty Dog" by Procol Harum
"Runaway" by Del Shannon
"Everyday People" by Sly and the Family Stone
"Darkness, Darkness" by the Youngbloods
"Get Together" by the Youngbloods
"Purple Haze" by the Jimi Hendrix Experience
"Foxy Lady" by the Jimi Hendrix Experience
"Are You Experienced?" by the Jimi Hendrix Experience
"The Star-Spangled Banner" by the Jimi Hendrix Experience

References

External links

1982 films
Films shot in Minnesota
American films about cannabis
Films directed by David Burton Morris
1980s English-language films